Giovanni Waal (born May 25, 1989) is a Surinamese footballer who plays as a forward for Inter Moengotapoe in the Hoofdklasse, and for the Suriname national team.

Career 
Waal began his career at SV Voorwaarts in Paramaribo, making his debut in the 2009-10 SVB Hoofdklasse season. After two season he transferred to SV Leo Victor, finishing the season as the league's joint top scorer together with Ulrich Reding (of SV Boskamp), both finishing with 20 goals each. The following season saw Waal transfer to SV Robinhood where he played for two seasons. In 2014 Waal transferred to Inter Moengotapoe winning the National championship in his first season with his new club.

International career 
Waal plays International football for Suriname, having made his debut in the final qualifying round of the 2010 Caribbean Cup, in the 2–1 loss against Antigua and Barbuda. He also participated in the team's 2014 FIFA World Cup qualification campaign, making four appearances against Cayman Islands, Dominican Republic and El Salvador, failing to help his team advance to further qualifying rounds. On 9 June 2012 he scored his first goal for the national team in a friendly match against French Guiana which ended in a 2–1 loss. He has also represented Suriname in the 2012 Caribbean Cup qualification, the 2018 FIFA World Cup qualification and the ABCS Tournament.

Career statistics

International performance
Statistics accurate as of matches played on 16 June 2015,

International goals
Scores and results list Suriname' goal tally first.

Honors

Club
Inter Moengotapoe	
 SVB Hoofdklasse (1): 2014–15

Individual
SVB Hoofdklasse Top Goalscorer: 2011–12 (joint)

References

External links 
 

Living people
1989 births
Sportspeople from Paramaribo
Surinamese footballers
Suriname international footballers
S.V. Leo Victor players
S.V. Robinhood players
S.V. Voorwaarts players
SVB Eerste Divisie players
Association football forwards